Balkrishna Gupta (5 March 1910 – 10 September 1972) was an Indian politician. He was a Member of Parliament, representing Bihar in the Rajya Sabha the upper house of India's Parliament as a member of the Socialist Party.

He earned his degree of Bachelor of Science from London School of Economics. Later, after he returned back to India, he was editor of Ram Manohar Lohia's hindi journal Jan.

Publications and parliamentary debates

References

External links

Rajya Sabha members from Bihar
1910 births
Year of death missing